Peter Barron (born 1962) is a Northern Irish journalist and Google's head of communications for Europe, Middle East and Africa.

Peter Barron was born in Belfast and educated at the Royal Belfast Academical Institution.  He spent most of his career at the BBC, and immediately prior to his Google appointment in 2008 had for four years been editor of the BBC programme Newsnight.

Career overview

 Mid-1980s, Luxembourg News Digest
 1987 Editor and journalist, Algarve News and Algarve Magazine
 1988 BBC News trainee
 1990 Producer, BBC Newsnight
 1997 Deputy editor, Channel 4 News, ITN
 2002 Deputy editor, Tonight with Trevor McDonald
 2003 Editor, BBC current affairs
 2004 Editor, Newsnight
 2006–07 Advisory chair, Edinburgh International TV Festival
 2008 Head of comms and public affairs, Google UK, Benelux and Ireland

Awards
He won the 1995 Royal Television Society award for Newsnight's coverage of the arms-to-Iraq scandal.

References

BBC newsreaders and journalists
Living people
Television personalities from Belfast
1962 births